Lynn Knippenborg (born 7 January 1992) is a Dutch handball player for Neckarsulmer SU.

She represented the Dutch national team at the 2014 European Women's Handball Championship.

References

Dutch female handball players
1992 births
Living people
People from Winterswijk
Sportspeople from Gelderland
Dutch expatriate sportspeople in Norway
Dutch expatriate sportspeople in Germany
Expatriate handball players
Dutch expatriate sportspeople in Denmark
21st-century Dutch women